Aldenay Vasallo Machado (born February 25, 1977) is a female hammer thrower from Cuba. She set her personal best throw (69.72 metres) on June 20, 2003 at a meet in Havana, Cuba.

Achievements

References

sports-reference

1977 births
Living people
Cuban female hammer throwers
Athletes (track and field) at the 2004 Summer Olympics
Olympic athletes of Cuba
Place of birth missing (living people)
Central American and Caribbean Games gold medalists for Cuba
Competitors at the 1998 Central American and Caribbean Games
Central American and Caribbean Games medalists in athletics